Lengua Armada Discos is an American punk and hardcore independent record label run by Limp Wrist/Los Crudos frontman and prominent figure in both the straight edge scene and the queercore scene, Martin Sorrondeguy.   It features such bands as Look Back and Laugh, Charles Bronson, Severed Head of State and Sin Orden.

Artists on Lengua Armada Discos

What Happens Next?
Charles Bronson
Limp Wrist
Look Back and Laugh
MK-ULTRA
Huasipungo
Revolución X
Severed Head of State
Sin Orden
The Locust
Dangermouse
In/Humanity
Q-Factor
Dir Yassin
Short Hate
Smartut Kahol Lavan
Eucharist
Broken Needle
La Voz
Palatka
Punch in the Face
Condenada
Temper
Jump Off A Building
No Thanks
Rákosi

References

See also
 List of record labels
 Latino punk

Punk record labels
Hardcore record labels
American independent record labels
Companies based in Chicago